Palmar is a village in the Soriano Department of western Uruguay.

Geography
The village is located on Route 55 and the south bank of Río Negro, just south of the Palmar Dam.

History
On 26 March 1982, the urban conglomeration named "Coronel Lorenzo Latorre", which had been formed in 1973 as a result of the construction of the Palmar Dam, was given the status of "Pueblo" (village) by the Act of Decreto-Ley Nº 15.254. On 28 December 1990, it was renamed "Palmar" by the Act of Ley Nº 16.170.

Population
In 2011 Palmar had a population of 381.
 
Source: Instituto Nacional de Estadística de Uruguay

References

External links
INE map of Palmar
Site about the Constitution Dam - About the village of Palmar

Populated places in the Soriano Department